Donax is a genus of small, edible saltwater clams, marine bivalve molluscs. The genus is sometimes known as bean clams or wedge shells; however, Donax species have numerous different common names in different parts of the world. In the southeastern U.S. they are known as "coquina", a word that is also used for the hard limestone concretions of their shells and those of other marine organisms.

Ecology
Species of Donax live, sometimes in high concentrations, vertically aligned in the sand on exposed beaches, on tropical and temperate coasts worldwide. When the waves wash these small clams out of the sand, they can dig back in again quite rapidly.  They are filter feeders. Some species, such as Donax variabilis, migrate vertically and horizontally with changes in the tides. These coquina clams are found extensively on the east coast beaches of Trinidad (Mayaro) and widely available in Venezuela.  They are called "Chip Chip" in Trinidad & Tobago and "Chipi Chipi" in Venezuela.

Species

Species within the genus Donax include:

 Donax asper Hanley 1845
 Donax assimilis Hanley, 1845 
 Donax baliregteri Huber, 2012 
 Donax bertini Pilsbry, 1901 
 Donax bipartitus Sowerby III, 1892 
 Donax brazieri Smith, 1892
 Donax bruneirufi Huber, 2012
 Donax burnupi Sowerby III, 1894 
 Donax caelatus Carpenter, 1857 
 Donax californicus Conrad, 1837 
 Donax carinatus Hanley, 1843
 Donax clathratus Reeve, 1855 
 Donax culter Hanley, 1845
 Donax cuneatus Linnaeus, 1758 
 Donax denticulatus Linnaeus, 1758
 Donax dentifer Hanley, 1843
 Donax ecuadorianus Olsson, 1961 
 Donax erythraeensis Bertin, 1881
 Donax faba Gmelin, 1791
 Donax fossor Say, 1822 - was thought at one time to be a northern form of D. variabilis
 Donax francisensis (Cotton & Godfrey, 1938)
 Donax gemmula Morrison, 1971 
 Donax gouldii Dall, 1921 - The bean clam, aka Donax gracilis Hanley 1845 
 Donax hanleyanus (Philippi, 1847)
 Donax kindermanni (Philippi, 1847) 
 Donax lubricus Hanley, 1845 
 Donax madagascariensis Wood, 1828
 Donax nitidus Deshayes, 1855 
 Donax obesulus Reeve 1854 
 Donax obesus d'Orbigny, 1845
 Donax oweni Hanley, 1843
 Donax paxillus Reeve, 1854 
 Donax punctatostriatus Hanley, 1843
 Donax rothi Coan, 1983
 Donax semistriatus Poli, 1795 
 Donax serra Röding, 1798 
 Donax simplex Sowerby III, 1897 
 Donax sordidus Hanley, 1845 
 Donax striatus Linnaeus, 1767 
 Donax texasianus Philippi, 1847 
 Donax townsendi Sowerby III, 1894 
 Donax transversus Sowerby I, 1825 
 Donax trunculus Linnaeus, 1758 - Locally known as tellin in French, tellina or telline in Italian, coquina in Spanish and conquilha or cadelinha in Portuguese.
 Donax variabilis Say, 1822 - Known in Florida under the Spanish word "coquina", is the common and colorful Donax species of the southern Atlantic and Gulf shores from Virginia to the Caribbean.  This species is locally abundant on beaches with fine sand from the mid-Atlantic coast to Texas.
 Donax variegatus  (Gmelin, 1791)
 Donax vellicatus Reeve, 1855 
 Donax veneriformis Lamarck, 1818 
 Donax veruinus Hanley, 1913
 Donax vittatus (da Costa, 1778)

The empty small (15 to 25 mm) shells of Donax variabilis and Donax fossor may be found washed up on the beach, especially at low tide. The living animals can often be seen where the waves wash the sand around in the shallowest part of the littoral zone as the tidal level changes. These clams can use the action of waves to move themselves up and down the beach, quickly burrowing into a new location before they can be swept away (the so-called "dance of the coquina").

References
 Wildlife of Sydney - Fact File -  Pipi, Goolwa Cockle, Surf Clam Fact File

Further reading
 The Nautilus, On the species of Donax of Eastern North America, March 1892, pp. 125-126
  Wayne A. O'Connor & Stephan J. O'Connor, "Early ontogeny of the pipi, Donax (Plebidonax) deltoides (Donacidae; Bivalvia)"; Molluscan Research 31(1): 53–56; 

Donacidae
Bivalve genera